Anjirak is the name of a mountain pass in Afghanistan. It lies to the left of the Chayab valley. It is said to not present any particular difficulties to cross.

References

Mountain passes of Afghanistan
Landforms of Takhar Province